Basie on the Beatles is an album by pianist and bandleader Count Basie featuring performances recorded in late 1969 and released on the short-lived Happy Tiger label. It was Basie's second album of Beatles' compositions following 1966's Basie's Beatle Bag and featured liner notes by Ringo Starr.

Reception

AllMusic awarded the album 2 stars.

Track listing
All compositions by John Lennon and Paul McCartney except for Track 3, by George Harrison.
 "Norwegian Wood (This Bird Has Flown)" – 2:55
 "The Fool on the Hill" – 3:19
 "Something" – 3:25
 "With a Little Help from My Friends" – 3:23
 "Here, There and Everywhere" – 2:34
 "Get Back" – 3:22
 "Hey Jude" – 4:20
 "Eleanor Rigby" – 2:56
 "Penny Lane" – 3:17
 "Come Together" – 2:42
 "Yesterday" – 3:21

Personnel 
Count Basie – piano, organ
Sonny Cohn, Gene Goe, Luis Gasca – trumpet 
Waymon Reed – trumpet, flugelhorn
Grover Mitchell, Mel Wanzo – trombone
Bill Hughes – bass trombone
Marshal Royal – alto saxophone, clarinet
Bobby Plater – alto saxophone, flute 
Eric Dixon – tenor saxophone, flute
Eddie "Lockjaw" Davis – tenor saxophone
Charlie Fowlkes – baritone saxophone
Freddie Green – guitar
Norman Keenan  – bass, electric bass
Carol Kaye  – electric bass
Harold Jones – drums
Bob Florence – arranger

References 

1970 albums
Count Basie Orchestra albums
Happy Tiger Records albums
Albums arranged by Bob Florence
The Beatles tribute albums